Director of Audit may refer to:

Chief audit executive - a corporate executive position
Director of Audit (Hong Kong) - head of the Audit Commission of Hong Kong